The Simeon Mills House is located in Madison, Wisconsin.

History
Simeon Mills was a member of the Wisconsin State Senate and was a key figure in establishing what would become the University of Wisconsin–Madison. The house was listed on the National Register of Historic Places in 1987 and on the State Register of Historic Places in 1989.

References

Houses on the National Register of Historic Places in Wisconsin
National Register of Historic Places in Madison, Wisconsin
Houses in Madison, Wisconsin
Italianate architecture in Wisconsin
Brick buildings and structures
Houses completed in 1863